The Crew Motorfest is an upcoming racing video game developed by Ubisoft Ivory Tower and published by Ubisoft for PlayStation 4, PlayStation 5, Windows, Xbox One, and Xbox Series X/S. It will be the sequel to 2018's The Crew 2 and the third game in The Crew series. As with its predecessors, the game is set in an open world environment; however, unlike the predecessors (which were set in the Contiguous United States), Motorfest would be set in a scaled-down version of the Hawaiian island of Oahu.

Gameplay 
The Crew Motorfest will be set in a scaled-down version of the island of Oahu in Hawaii. It will be themed around a festival that will serve as the main area for accessing the various events in the game, which is similar to that of the Forza Horizon series of games. Its gameplay is similar to that of the previous games in the series, featuring online multiplayer features referred to in game as a "crew", as well as being able to control vehicles other than cars such as planes and boats.

Development and release 
Motorfest is being developed by Ubisoft Ivory Tower. It was internally known as Project Orlando during development until October 2022 when the title and setting of the game were leaked. It was announced with a teaser trailer released on January 31, 2023. A closed testing period for Motorfest on PC began on February 1, 2023, with testing for consoles coming at a later date. The game is expected to release in 2023 for PlayStation 4, PlayStation 5, Windows, Xbox One, and Xbox Series X/S. Journalists noted the similarities between Motorfest and the first two Test Drive Unlimited games (2006 and 2011), which several developers from Ivory Tower worked on previously and also share Oʻahu as a main setting.

References

External links
 

Upcoming video games scheduled for 2023
Open-world video games
Persistent worlds
PlayStation 4 games
PlayStation 5 games
Racing video games
Ubisoft games
Video games developed in France
Video games set in Hawaii
Video game sequels
Windows games
Xbox One games
Xbox Series X and Series S games
Multiplayer and single-player video games